Colomesus tocantinensis is a species of pufferfish in the family Tetraodontidae. It is endemic to Brazil, where it inhabits the Tocantins River basin. It reaches a length of 3.5 cm (1.4 inches) SL. The species was described in 2013 by Cesar R. L. Amaral, Paulo M. Brito, Dayse A. Silva, and Elizeu F. Carvalho based on morphology and genetic evidence, both of which separate it from its congeners Colomesus asellus and C. psittacus.

References 

Tetraodontidae
Fish described in 2013
Fauna of Brazil